Kent was a Swedish alternative rock band, formed in Eskilstuna in 1990. With members Joakim Berg, Martin Sköld, Sami Sirviö and Markus Mustonen, the band had numerous radio hits throughout Sweden and Scandinavia and consecutive number-one studio albums on the Sweden top list (Sverigetopplistan) beginning with the release of Verkligen (1996) and led by the single "Kräm (så nära får ingen gå)". With origins rooted in distorted rock, they found mainstream success through their alternative rock albums of the mid-1990s, 2000s and 2010s, the latter decades during which they adopted elements of synthpop. With eleven number-one albums, five number-one singles, 23 Swedish Grammy Awards, and over 3 million record sales, Kent is considered the most popular rock/pop group within Sweden and throughout Scandinavia. Vapen & ammunition (2002) topped the Swedish charts for 95 weeks. Kent is often compared to bands like U2 and Coldplay.

As Kent's songs are primarily performed in Swedish, they are unfamiliar to most English-speaking audiences. Kent briefly attempted an international career with English versions of the albums Isola (1997) and Hagnesta Hill (1999) and an accompanying American tour for the former, but stopped after finding less success than they had in Scandinavia. Joakim Berg, the lead singer and lyricist, says "there are two kinds of lyrics I write. One kind is based in places and the other is based in feelings. You move between those two whether you want to or not."

"VinterNoll2" is an unlockable track in Career Mode on Guitar Hero World Tour. They have their own SingStar called SingStar Kent released on PlayStation 2 and 3.

The band announced on 16 March 2016 that they would release their final album, titled Då som nu för alltid, after 26 years of performing. The album was released on 20 May 2016. The band's announcement noted that the dissolution of the band is voluntary and is despite their continued success.

Kent's final concert was held at Tele2 Arena in Stockholm on 17 December 2016, ending a months-long farewell tour that covered Sweden, Norway, Finland, and Denmark.

History

Jones & Giftet and Havsänglar (1990–1994)
The band Jones & Giftet (Jones & the Poison) was formed in 1990 with members Joakim "Jocke" Berg, Martin Sköld, Markus Mustonen, Sami Sirviö and Thomas Bergqvist (synthesizers). It all started with Berg going to London and buying two guitars, one for Sirviö and one for himself. Sirviö and Berg had a band that rehearsed at Balsta Musikslott which consisted of three people. Inspired by My Bloody Valentine, Sköld and Berg decided they were going to start a new band. This happened at the school S:t Eskils cafeteria Grönan. Berg and Sköld met up with a very drunk Mustonen outside of the Restaurant Vildsvinet in Eskilstuna. Whilst drunk, he promised to join the band and play the drums. Thomas Bergqvist, a friend of Martin Sköld, was invited to come along and play the synth. The first gig was played in Lindesberg in Västmanland, and the second at Knegoffs in Eskilstuna. In 1991, Jones & Giftet won the contest Cult 91 at the Skylight in Eskilstuna.

1992 is the year that Martin Roos plays with Jones & Giftet for the first time at Cult 92. Soon thereafter Thomas Bergqvist was replaced by Martin Roos. On 30 September 1991 Jones & Giftet changed their name to Havsänglar (Angelshark lit. Sea angels). Gigs at the "Spaghetti Companiet", Hannas Krog and the Pet Sounds Bar followed.

In 1993, Martin Roos moved up to Stockholm, and soon the rest followed. Jocke Berg's brother Adam, came up with the new name Kent. Kent played at Stockholm venues Tanto, Hyndans Hörna and Uppsala venue Kalmar Nation.

In March 1994 Kent recorded a 10-track demo under very simple conditions in an 8-track studio at Nytorpsskolan near Blåsut in Stockholm.
The demo was given to Peter Ejheden at pet Sounds who back then was working as a booker for a club (Pet Sounds Bar). In the same chain of events where he got the tape, Ejheden quit Pet Sounds and started working at BMG. In April Per Lindholm, A&R at RCA/BMG heard Kent for the first time and was immediately interested. On 26 June Kent's first contract was signed. Kent went up to Silence Studios in Koppom, Värmland, to record the debut-album.

Kent and Verkligen (1995–1996)

In March 1995, Kent released their eponymous debut Kent. It was distorted and not much reminiscent of what Kent would release in later years. The first single from the debut album was "När det blåser på månen".

Just one year later, in 1996, Kent released Verkligen (Really). Guitarist Martin Roos had left the band for his career at Kent's record company BMG. He would later become the band's manager. The pre-release single "Kräm (så nära får ingen gå)" immediately became a radio hit and gained Kent some serious fame in Sweden. Two more singles were issued, "Gravitation" and "Halka". Musically, the album was slower with less distortion and more emotion.

Isola (1997–1998)

In November 1997, Kent released Isola. Guitarist Harri Mänty had joined the group since Verkligen. Verkligen had been heavily toured, gaining some reputation for Kent. The pre-release single, "Om du var här" (If You Were Here), became a radio hit. Musically the album changed a lot from Verkligen, going a lot in the direction of slower, more thoughtful songs with more emotion. The last song on the album, the 7 minute, 47 second-long "747", with a characteristic keyboard riff and a long instrumental outro, became the band's closer for every show for the next 8 years. It was also released as a single, cut down to four minutes and with an added short chorus.

In 1998, Kent released an English version of Isola, featuring an extra song only available on the English version, "Velvet". Kent embarked on two accompanying US tours to promote the album. The first was in support of fellow Swedes, The Cardigans, and the second was a double-bill with American band, Papa Vegas. The band would close the shows for the second leg of the tour with what they described as their "only cover song", a version of Depeche Mode's classic single, "Stripped". Singles were released in various territories for three of the album's songs, "If You Were Here", "Things She Said" and "747". The English version of Isola sold poorly outside of Scandinavia.

Hagnesta Hill and B-sidor 95-00 (1999–2000)
In December 1999, Kent released Hagnesta Hill, named after Hagnestahill, a part of Eskilstuna where the band had had their first studio. The first single from the album, "Musik non stop" (Music Non Stop), a disco-rock song, became a huge radio hit. The album was, for the most part, faster and less ballad-focused than Isola, and also mildly experimental with drum-machines and electronics. Two more singles were released, the industrial-esque "En himmelsk drog" (A Heavenly Drug) and the power-poppy "Kevlarsjäl" (Kevlar Soul).

In April 2000, an English version of Hagnesta Hill was released, featuring two songs from the Swedish version replaced with two new English tracks ("Just Like Money" and "Quiet Heart").  The album was also released in a limited digipack with one of the excluded songs, "A Timekill to Die For", included as a hidden bonus track.  The album was accompanied by the release of the single, "Music Non Stop", featuring the other omitted song, "Insects", as a b-side. A planned US release of the album was shelved, resulting in only "cut-out" promo copies floating around.  Likewise, a US tour never materialized, as there was officially no album to promote. In connection with the release of the English version of Hagnesta Hill, Kent went on a European tour. They finished the tour at the Roskilde Festival.

Since their debut, Kent had recorded a large number of b-sides. Since most of these singles had long gone out of print, it was very hard to get these legally, so in 2000, Kent released the 2CD B-side collection B-sidor 95–00 (B-Sides 95–00). It featured 21 b-sides and two totally new songs. A documentary was also shot the same year, Så nära får ingen gå – ett år med Kent. The documentary was produced by Per Sinding-Larsen and Mathias Engstrand.

Vapen & ammunition and the White Concert (2002–2003)

After a seven-month timeout, Kent started to work on their next full-length album during the summer of 2001. Later that year they reported from the studio that they tried to make an album consisting of almost just singles. The first single "Dom andra" (The Others) released on 18 March 2002 became a huge hit on Swedish radio. When the album Vapen & ammunition (Weapon(s) & Ammunition) came out, the next two singles "Kärleken väntar" (Love Awaits) and "FF" (from the double A-side FF / VinterNoll2), plus the album track "Pärlor" (Pearls) became huge radio hits, resulting in album sales over 600,000, more than twice as many as any other Kent album to date. The definite proof of the album's success was evident when the band received seven Swedish Grammy Awards in 2003.

Kent hadn't toured for several months when it was announced that they would only do one single performance in Sweden in 2003, on 6 June, the Swedish national day, in Stockholms Stadion which holds a crowd of 30,000. As the band told the crowd to come there dressed in white, it was nicknamed "The White Concert". The band also played at the less known Parkfestivalen in Moss, Norway on 14 June 2003.

Du & jag döden and The hjärta & smärta EP (2005–2006)

After taking a one-year timeout, Kent returned to the studio to record their sixth album in 2004. Studio reports said it would be "a very dark album". The first single released, "Max 500", was well received by both fans and critics. When the album Du & jag döden (You & me death) was released, it was very well received and was considered by most fans to be one of their best albums. Two more singles were released, "Palace & Main" and "Den döda vinkeln" (The Dead Angle) – the last one stirring up some controversy among Kent fans because Kent didn't release any b-sides along with it (but still the single has a shorter version of the song). The last track on the album, "Mannen i den vita hatten (16 år senare)" (The Man in the White Hat (16 Years Later)) was very well received and is seen by many fans as Kent's best effort. It also became the first song ever to replace "747" as the finale of a Kent concert.

During 2005 they embarked on "Turné 19" (Tour 19), doing 12 gigs in Sweden, one in Norway and one in Finland. The concerts took place in huge tents with a capacity of up to 18,000. This was the only tour that followed the release of Du & jag döden. After "Turné 19", Kent played once more at the Roskilde Festival.

There were rumours about Kent releasing an EP, as they had been spotted in studio and guitarist Sami had said, "We might release an EP, but if we do it will only be digitally released." Just one month before the November 2005 release, The hjärta & smärta EP (The Heart & Pain EP) was confirmed, as a CD as well as a digital release. It was well received and contained five tracks, "Dom som försvann" (Those Who Disappeared) becoming the radio single and having a video recorded. The EP made No. 1 in Sweden and remained on the charts for 33 weeks.

During 2006, the band played only once in Sweden on the Hultsfred Festival and on two festivals in Norway. They've also released the single "Nålens öga" for Swedish Save the children.

Tillbaka till samtiden and Box 1991–2008 (2007–2008)

During December 2006 – 2007 the band announced—on two different occasions—that they had started recording their seventh Swedish studio album, and that guitarist Harri Mänty had decided to leave the band.

On 18 July 2007, the band announced the title and release date of their new album, Tillbaka till samtiden (Swedish for "Back to the Present"). Its official release was on 17 October 2007 but many stores began selling it five days in advance due to an internet leak of the album. The first single of the album was released on 17 September 2007 with the title "Ingenting" (Swedish for "Nothing"). The band played four songs at a private gig in Denmark where their new album premiered. The sound of the album has been described as more electro based rock. Due to the speed in which the tour's concerts were sold out, the band added seven extra concerts to their Scandinavian tour. As well, lead singer Joakim Berg has remarked that Tillbaka till samtiden contains some of his favourite material he has recorded. They were also presented with Album of the Year and Group of the Year at the 2008 Swedish Grammy Awards. They went on to win a Rockbjörnen (Swedish for "The rock bear") award for Swedish Album of the Year and a P3 Guld award for Swedish Group of the Year. Kent released the compilation Box 1991–2008, featuring all their previous studio albums and previously unreleased material, in all Nordic countries on 29 October 2008.

On 23 December 2008, Kent released a new song, "På drift?". "Kent wishes you all a Merry Christmas and a Happy New Year by offering a brand new song for free," the band writes on the website (kent.nu).

Röd and En plats i solen (2009–2010)

On 4 October 2009, Kent announced their eighth studio album Röd and the first single "Töntarna" was released on 5 October as digital download. Röd was released on 5 November 2009 and has an even greater touch of synthesizers than previous albums. On the release day of Röd, Kent played in front of a hundred specially invited guests (mostly journalists) at The Bowery Hotel in New York. The setlist consisted of 6 tracks from the new album, and the whole thing was shown live on Aftonbladet's website.

On 2 November 2009, Kent auctioned off 100 limited physical copies of the song "2000" for charity. The song was also released as digital download. "2000" was used as the theme song for the Swedish TV-series Hemlösa, covering the homeless problem in Stockholm.

On 14 June 2010, Kent announced their ninth studio album, En plats i solen (Swedish for "A Place in the Sun") due for release on 30 June, only seven months after the release of their previous studio album, Röd. Joakim has said about the recording of En plats i solen: "We had a kind of idea that we were going to record an album very quickly this time, we had already some demos ready. We wanted to go into the studio, record and mix the album and then distribute it directly." Unlike the two previous albums, which were produced with Danish producer Joshua, En plats i solen is produced with Swedish producer Stefan Boman who worked with the band on Du & jag döden (2005). The band also released the first single from the forthcoming album, featuring the two A-sides "Gamla Ullevi" and "Skisser för sommaren".

Kent embarked on a summer tour in Sweden, Norway, Finland and Denmark, starting at the Peace & Love festival in Sweden and finishing on 8 August at the Skanderborg Festival in Denmark.

Jag är inte rädd för mörkret and Tigerdrottningen (2012–2015)

On 22 June 2011, Kent signed a recording contract with Universal Music in Sweden, after sixteen years with BMG and later Sony Music. The band's manager, Martin Roos, said in a press release: "After sixteen years with BMG/Sony Music it feels great with a new beginning, and Universal Music gave us the best offer. In April 2012 Kent released their tenth studio album, Jag är inte rädd för mörkret (Swedish for "I Am Not Afraid of the Dark"). It was recorded in France. The album included the songs "999" and "Jag ser dig" which was well received by both fans and critics. Jag är inte rädd för mörkret is very piano-based.

In December 2012, Kent announced on their Twitter account that they were to release a track on New Year's Day called "Ingen kunde röra oss".

In the fall of 2013, Kent went to Los Angeles and recorded their eleventh album, Joakim said in an interview: "We wanted to do this kind of Fleetwood Mac thing and go to LA and dream under the sun. Now the dollar is so low, in addition – all the big studios are empty, no one uses them anymore." The first single "La Belle Epoque" was released on 12 March 2014 and the album Tigerdrottningen was released on 30 April. During the month of May Kent went on a small club tour in Norway, Sweden and Denmark. In the summer of 2014 Kent held their own festival called Kentfest in Gothenburg and Stockholm. They also played at festivals in Denmark and Norway.

In 2015, Kent played at three festivals in Scandinavia, Joakim Berg announced at the Bråvalla festival that they were going to record a new album that fall. That year, Kent celebrated the 20th anniversary of their debut album, Kent, by releasing the band's first 10 albums on vinyl.

Då som nu för alltid and the final tour (2016)

In February 2016, Kent was elected to Swedish Music Hall of Fame. In March the band announced that Då som nu för alltid (Swedish for "Then as Now Forever") would be their last album, and that they would make a final tour in the Nordic countries, with the last concert in Stockholm in December 2016. "Egoist" was announced as the album's first single, and it was released on 14 March. However, on 17 April 2016 Kent announced the track listing which omitted "Egoist". Instead, "Vi är inte längre där" was released as the album's first single on 3 May. The album Då som nu för alltid was released on 20 May 2016. On 24 August, it was announced the compilation album Best of would be released on 16 September 2016, containing 20 previously released tracks and four new studio recordings. For Då som nu för alltid the band won two Swedish Grammy Awards, Album of the Year and Rock of the Year.

From the spring of 2015 until the band's very last concert, Per Sinding-Larsen followed Kent's last time together to record a documentary called Vi är inte längre där (Sista åren med Kent), which was shown on SVT in two parts on the 26 and 27 December, 2016. The documentary revealed, among other things, that Harri Mänty was in fact fired from the band due to too much partying, and not that he jumped off on his own initiative, as has been said before.

Musical style and influences
Kent have been grouped with various genres, including alternative rock, indie rock, pop rock, synth-pop, pop, and arena rock.

Kent's first and perhaps most significant influences for the band's sound were My Bloody Valentine and The Cure. The band is also a fan of David Bowie, Depeche Mode, U2 and Radiohead. Kent has been referred to as Sweden's biggest rock band, but has always put pop melodies in focus. Kent's biggest change in musical style came with the band's seventh studio album Tillbaka till samtiden, which marked a clear shift from alternative rock to synthpop/rock.

Band members
Members
 Joakim Berg – lead vocals, guitars (1990–2016)
 Martin Sköld – bass, keyboards (1990–2016)
 Sami Sirviö – guitars, keyboards (1990–2016)
 Markus Mustonen – drums, backing vocals, keyboards, piano (1990–2016)
 Harri Mänty – guitars (1996–2006)
 Martin Roos – guitars (1992–1995)
 Thomas Bergquist – keyboards (1990–1992)

Touring musicians
 Andreas Bovin – keyboards, piano, guitars (1996–2016)
 Max Brandt – guitars (2007–2016)
 Ida Redig – backing vocals (2014–2015)
 Miriam Bryant – backing vocals (2014–2015)
 Naomi Pilgrim – backing vocals (2014–2015)
 Carolina Wallin Pérez – backing vocals (2015–2016)
 Daniela Rathana – backing vocals (2016)
 Malin Brudell – backing vocals (2016)

Discography

Albums
 Kent (1995)
 Verkligen (1996)
 Isola (1997)
 Hagnesta Hill (1999)
 Vapen & ammunition (2002)
 Du & jag döden (2005)
 Tillbaka till samtiden (2007)
 Röd (2009)
 En plats i solen (2010)
 Jag är inte rädd för mörkret (2012)
 Tigerdrottningen (2014)
 Då som nu för alltid (2016)

EPs
The Hjärta & Smärta EP (2005)

Compilations
B-sidor 95–00 (2000)
Box 1991–2008 (2008)
Best of (2016)

Awards
1996 
Grammis - Best Pop/Rock Group
1997
Grammis - Best Music Video (Gravitation) 
Grammis - Best Producer (Nille Perned)
Rockbjörn - Album of the Year (Verkligen)
1998
Grammis - Best Album (Isola)
Grammis - Best Pop/Rock Group
Rockbjörn - Best Swedish Group
Rockbjörn - Best Swedish Album (Isola)
Guldgadden - Best Live Band
2000
Grammis - Best Pop/Rock Group
Rockbjörn - Best Swedish Group
Rockbjörn - Best Swedish Song (Musik Non Stop)
2002
MTV Europe Music Award - Best Nordic Act
MTG Radio Airplay Award
2003
Grammis - Best Song (Dom andra)
Grammis - Best Artist
Grammis - Best Group
Grammis - Best Album (Vapen & ammunition)
Grammis - Best Songwriter (Joakim Berg)
Grammis - Best Composer (Joakim Berg)
Grammis - Best Producer (Kent, Martin von Schmalensee, Zed)
Rockbjörn - Best Swedish Group
Rockbjörn - Best Swedish Album  (Vapen & ammunition)
P3 Guld - Best Group
P3 Guld - Best Song (Dom andra)
2005
Nordic Music Awards - Best Nordic Artist
2006
Grammis - Best Rock Group
Grammis - Best Music Video (Dom som försvann)
P3 Guld - Best Group
Rockbjörn - Best Album (Du & jag döden)
2008
Grammis - Best Group
Grammis - Best Album (Tillbaka till samtiden)
P3 Guld - Best Group
Rockbjörn - Best Swedish Album (Tillbaka till samtiden)
2010
Grammis - Best Rock 
Grammis - Best Producer (Kent, Joshua)
P3 Guld - Best Group
Rockbjörn - Best Live Band
2013
P3 Guld - Best Group
2015
Grammis - Best Rock 
Grammis - Best Songwriter (Joakim Berg)
2016
 Hall of Fame - Swedish Music Hall of Fame
2017
Grammis - Best Rock
Grammis - Best Album (Då som nu för alltid)
P3 Guld - Best Group
Rockbjörn - Best Live Band

See also
 Music of Sweden

References

External links

 
 

Musical groups established in 1990
Swedish alternative rock groups
Culture in Eskilstuna
1990 establishments in Sweden
English-language singers from Sweden
Swedish pop music groups
Musical quartets
Swedish-language singers
MTV Europe Music Award winners